The Order of the Golden Age (OGA) was an international animal rights society with a Christian, theosophical and vegetarian emphasis, which existed between 1895 and 1959.

History

The Order of the Golden Age (OGA) was founded by Rev. Henry John Williams (younger brother of Howard Williams) in 1882. Sidney Hartnoll Beard re-established the OGA in 1895.

The renewed OGA's headquarters were located at Beard's residence in Ilfracombe. The Order promoted psychical research, spiritualism and vegetarianism. In 1904, the OGA's new headquarters were located at Barcombe Hall in Paignton. Beard was the editor of the Herald of the Golden Age (1896–1918), the official journal for the OGA. The aim of the journal was to promote the "fruitarian system of living, and to teach its advantages." The journal promoted vegetarianism from a Christian perspective. According to an advertisement of the journal, it "challenges the morality of Carnivorous Customs and advocates Practical Christianity, Hygienic Common Sense, Social Reform, Philanthropy and Universal Benevolence. It is opposed to War, Slaughter, Cruelty and Oppression, and is designed to promote Goodness, but not goody goodyism, and Orthodoxy of Heart, rather than Orthodoxy of Creed." Josiah Oldfield, the noted British lawyer, physician and promoter of fruitarianism, was a member of the OGA.

By 1909, the OGA was active in 47 countries, and its headquarters transferred to London. The OGA organised successful concerts at the Royal Albert Hall. The OGA even claimed to have converted Pope Pius X to the vegetarian diet during 1907. In 1938, the Order decamped to South Africa upon the death of their official Founder and President, Sidney Hartnoll Beard, to become forgotten about by the vegetarian movement until the 21st century.

Legacy 
A commemorative website was created in 2006 and the OGA was mentioned in a modern published history of the vegetarian movement a year later. A large collection of volumes of The Herald of the Golden Age were digitised by the Internet Archive in 2008.

See also
 List of vegetarian organizations

Notes

References

Further reading

External links
Order of the Golden Age
The Herald of the Golden Age - International Association for the Preservation of Spiritualist and Occult Periodicals